The 2014 elections for the Pennsylvania House of Representatives were held on November 4, 2014, with all districts being contested. The primary elections were held on May 20, 2014. The term of office for those elected in 2014 began when the House of Representatives convened in January 2015. Pennsylvania State Representatives are elected for two-year terms, with all 203 seats up for election every two years. The Republicans gained eight seats to expand their majority in the chamber over the Democrats.

Results overview

Results by district

 

Source: Pennsylvania Department of State

See also
 Pennsylvania House of Representatives election, 2018

References

See also
 Pennsylvania House of Representatives election, 2018

2014 Pennsylvania elections
2014
Pennsylvania House of Representatives